Mahjoub (from the adjective مَحْجُوب (maḥjūb) with the meaning "invisible", "veiled", "hidden", "covered", "blocked") is a Muslim Arabic male given name (it exists the female version Mahjouba) and surname. Other romanizations from the Arabic script include Mahdjoub, Mahjub, Mahdschub, Mahjoob, Mahgoub, Mahgub and Mahgoob. Notable people with this name include:

Surname 
 A. Monem Mahjoub (born 1963), Libyan linguist, philosopher, poet, historian, and political critic
 Abderrahmane Mahjoub (1929–2011), French-Moroccan footballer
 Alireza Mahjoub (born 1958), Iranian politician
 Jamal Mahjoub (born 1966), British-Sudanese writer
 Javad Mahjoub (born 1991), Iranian judoka
 Mohammad Jafar Mahjoub (1924–1996), Iranian scholar
 Mohammad Zeki Mahjoub, Egyptian national imprisoned in Canada
 Morteza Mahjoub (born 1980), Iranian chess grandmaster
 Said Mustapha Mahdjoub, adopted Islamic name of the French soldier and mercenary Robert Denard (1929–2007)
 Semir Mahjoub (born 1964), Swedish-Tunisian businessman

Masculine given name 
 Mahjoub Haïda (born 1970), retired Moroccan middle distance runner
 Mahjoub Mohamed Salih (born 1929), Sudanese journalist
 Mahjoub Sharif (1948–2014), Sudanese poet, teacher and activist
 Mahjoub Tobji (born 1942), retired Moroccan army commandant

See also 
 Mahjouba (disambiguation), name of two settlements in North Africa
 Mahjoubi, Maghrebi Arabic surname
 Mahjouba Oubtil (born 1982), Moroccan female boxer

References 

Arabic-language surnames
Persian-language surnames